The Ice House is the last of the eight short films originally broadcast as part of the BBC's A Ghost Story for Christmas series of the 1970s, the first not directed by Lawrence Gordon Clark; Clark had become a freelance director and was working for ITV. The film was instead directed by Derek Lister.

It was first shown on BBC One on 25 December 1978. Like its predecessor, it was an original story. It was written by John Bowen who had earlier adapted The Treasure of Abbot Thomas in 1974. The film stars John Stride, Geoffrey Burridge and Elizabeth Romilly.

In the film, Paul (John Stride) has recently left his wife and has moved to a residential health spa located in an old country house to recuperate. A number of strange disappearances and attacks of "the cools" make Paul begin to suspect a strange flower growing near an old ice house and the strange behaviour of Clovis (Geoffrey Burridge) and Jessica (Elizabeth Romilly), the brother and sister who run the spa, may be something more sinister.

The film is not well regarded, being the last in the series before its cancellation, and barely a "ghost story" at all. Alex Davison, writing an essay for the BFI's 2012 release of the ghost stories states "Although The Ice House boasts some eerie scenes, it never quite recaptures the chills of Clark's set pieces" but notes it is "arguably the most daringly experimental film of the A Ghost Story for Christmas series".

Cast
John Stride as Paul
Elizabeth Romilly as Jessica
Geoffrey Burridge as Clovis
David Beames as Bob
Gladys Spencer as Diamond Lady
Eirene Beck as Rosetti Lady
Sam Avent as Gentleman Guest
Dennis Jennings as Gentleman Guest
Ronald Mayer as Gentleman Guest

References

External links
 
 

BBC television dramas
British ghost films
1978 horror films
1978 films
A Ghost Story for Christmas
1970s British films